Taoura is a district in Souk Ahras Province, Algeria named after its capital, Taoura.
The district is divided into the municipalities of Taoura, Zarouria, and Dréa. 

Districts of Souk Ahras Province